Robert Beattie, an American, Wichita-based, lawyer, is the author of the non-fiction book Nightmare in Wichita.

Career 
It is about BTK, a serial killer in Wichita, Kansas who created the name BTK after his modus operandi, "Bind Them, Torture Them, Kill Them". Dennis Rader started sending out letters to media again after hearing about the book. Right before he was going to publish it, Dennis Rader was arrested and then convicted as the BTK Killer. As a result, Beattie quickly wrote an epilogue.

Beattie is also known for interviewing serial killer Charles Manson for a class project as a professor at Newman University in Wichita, which stirred controversy and brought media attention to him. Language of Evil is about a murder in Douglas County, Kansas.

Beattie ran unsuccessfully for the office of Kansas Secretary of State in 2006. He testified in front of the Kansas legislature against the reliability of polygraph examinations .

Works
 Nightmare in Wichita, New American Library, 2005,

References

External links
Author's website

Living people
Newman University, Wichita faculty
Year of birth missing (living people)